Burnside is a townland of 38 acres in County Antrim, Northern Ireland. It is situated in the historic barony of Glenarm Lower and the civil parish of Ardclinis.

See also 
List of townlands in County Antrim
List of places in County Antrim

References

Townlands of County Antrim
Civil parish of Ardclinis